Pettavaithalai is a town between Tiruchirappalli and Karur.

History  
This village is a iconic milestone for teenagers of 1970s. Balu Mahendra shot his famous second film Aziyatha Kollangal in 27 days at Pettavaithalai, Sirugamani and Inungoor at a modest budget of Rs 8 lacs and released it in 1979. The film comprehensively captures growing up and its challenges.

Geography
Pettavaithalai is by the river Cauvery and this is the takeoff point for the Uyyakondan canal which is the major irrigation canal for the fertile lands in Trichy district.

Demographics

Languages 
The native language of Pettavaithalai is Tamil

Government and politics  
Pettavaithalai is part of Srirangam (state assembly constituency) in Tiruchirappalli District of Tamil Nadu State in India.

Transport

By Air  
Trichirapalli International Airport.

Pettavaithalai's nearest airport is Tiruchirapalli International Airport situated at 30.2 km distance. Few more airports around Pettavaithalai are Tiruchirapalli International Airport	30.2 km. Thanjavur Air Force Station	72.6 km. Salem Airport	109.0 km.

By Rail  
Pettavaithalai Railway station.

The nearest railway station to Pettavaithalai is Pettavaithalai which is located in and around 4.0 kilometer distance.

By Road  
Pettavaithalai bus stand.

The distance from Pettavaithalai to Trichy is 24 km and Pettavaithalai to Karur is 54 km.

Education 
Government higher secondary school Pettavaithalai 500 m
K.r.r. Nursery & Primary School, Pettavaithalai 2.4 km
Rathna Higher Secondary School Pettavaithalai	4.4 km.

Sevai Shandhi matriculation school, Pettavaithalai 5 km. Cabriyal metriculation school, palancovery 1 km. Government high school, Dhevasdhanam 3 km.

Reference 

Cities and towns in Tiruchirappalli district